Midorikawa Dam  is a gravity dam located in Kumamoto Prefecture in Japan. The dam is used for flood control, irrigation and power production. The catchment area of the dam is 359 km2. The dam impounds about 181  ha of land when full and can store 46000 thousand cubic meters of water. The construction of the dam was started on 1964 and completed in 1970.

See also
List of dams in Japan

References

Dams in Kumamoto Prefecture